Sierra Leone was planning to participate at the 2014 Summer Youth Olympics, in Nanjing, China, but on 13 August 2014 they pulled out of the games due to pressure from Chinese Authorities in an attempt to prevent Ebola from West Africa from entering their nation. (see 2014 Ebola virus epidemic in Sierra Leone)

Beach Volleyball

Sierra Leone qualified a boys' and girls' team by their performance at the CAVB Qualification Tournament.

Swimming

Sierra Leone qualified one swimmer.

Boys

Weightlifting

Sierra Leone was given a quota to compete in a boys' event by the tripartite committee.

Boys

References

2014 in Sierra Leonean sport 
Nations at the 2014 Summer Youth Olympics
Sierra Leone at the Youth Olympics